The Shadow Cabinet of the 38th Legislative Assembly of British Columbia, constituting members of the opposition BC New Democratic Party, was formed under the leadership of Carole James in May 2005 following the general election.

List

See also
 Official Opposition Shadow Cabinet of the 40th Legislative Assembly of British Columbia
Cabinet of Canada
Official Opposition (Canada)
Shadow Cabinet

Politics of British Columbia